Anish John is a film sound designer, and mixer. He won the National Award for Best Sound Design (Best Audiography) for the film Labour of Love (Asha Jaoar Majhe, 2014). He bagged the Best Sound Design award at the 63rd Filmfare Awards, for the film Trapped (2017). He is the Sound Designer of the acclaimed Netflix series 'Sacred Games'. He was also the production sound mixer for Newton (2017) among other accomplishments. Anish has worked in English, Hindi, Bengali, Tamil, Malayalam, and Marathi films, besides having worked on numerous documentaries and creative advertisement projects.

Early life 

Born and raised in Kolkata, Anish did his schooling at Don Bosco School, Park Circus, and continued with college in the city itself, at St. Xaviers College. He then pursued his higher education, focusing on a formal film education, doing a three years course in Film Sound from the Film and Television Institute of India, Pune (FTII).

Career 

Anish moved to Mumbai after his graduation. He started his career as a sound recordist and editor for various shorts, narrative features and documentaries before shifting to sound-designing and mixing. His projects span a wide range from Indian narrative features, Ship Of Theseus (Toronto 2012), I.D.(2012), to noted International film and TV productions, such as Million Dollar Arm (2014) and 24 (Indian TV series 2013).

Filmography 
 Bell Bottom - (2021)
 Sherni - (2021)
 Bulbbul - (2020)
 Bhoot – Part One: The Haunted Ship - (2020)
 Cargo - (2019)
 Laal Kaptaan - (2019)
 The Sky Is Pink - (2019)
 Sacred Games (2018–19)
 Karwan - (2018)
 High Jack (2018)
 Pari (2018)
 Newton (2017)
 Trapped (2017)
 Ezra (2017)
 Kingdom Of Clay Subjects (2015)
 Blue Mountains (2015)
 Million Dollar Arm (2nd unit – India schedule) (2014 – Disney)
 Asha Jaoar Majhe (2014)
 Ajoba (2014)
 Ship of Theseus (2013)
 24 (TV series)
 London, Paris, New York (2012)
 Venalodungathe
 I.D. (2012)
 Peddlers (2012)
 The Reluctant Fundamentalist (2012)
 Miss Lovely (2012)
 Travelling with the Pros  (2012 - Sports documentary)
 The Greatest Love Story Ever Told (Documentary, 2011)
 Khichdi: The Movie (2010)

Awards

External links 
 
 Anish John at indianfilmfestival
 Anish John at the 13th Annual Film Festival LA.
 Anish John at 13th Annual Indian Film Festival Of Los Angeles - Opening Night Screening Of "Haraamkhor"
 Anish John Film Fare Awards Trapped (2016 Hindi film)#Awards.

References 

Indian sound designers
Living people
Year of birth missing (living people)
Film and Television Institute of India alumni
Musicians from Kolkata
Best Audiography National Film Award winners